Michael 'Mick' Maguire (6 June 1894 – 5 June 1950) was an Australian rules footballer who played for the Richmond Football Club in the VFL from 1910 to Round 8 of the 1912 season, then played for the Melbourne Football Club for the rest of 1912 to 1914. Finally he played for the Collingwood Football Club in 1918.

He holds the record as the youngest player to have played senior football at Richmond, being only 15 years and 328 days old upon debut in Round 1 of the 1910 season. Despite this, he was the club's leading goalkicker in his debut year. He also gained some notoriety as a welterweight boxer between 1912 and 1915.

Maguire was a well-known publican in Melbourne, operating the Bull and Mouth Hotel in Melbourne, and after 1932, Bellevue Hotel in Brisbane. He was father to five daughters; sometimes known as "the fabulous Maguires." Two daughters married members of the English nobility and Mary Maguire was briefly a Hollywood and British film actress in the late 1930s. Maguire served in the British Army in World War Two and died in England in 1950.

References 

 Hogan P: The Tigers Of Old, Richmond FC, Melbourne 1996
Rootsweb.ancestry.com

Richmond Football Club players
Melbourne Football Club players
Collingwood Football Club players
Australian rules footballers from Victoria (Australia)
1894 births
1950 deaths